The following lists events that happened during 1947 in Australia.

Incumbents

Monarch – George VI
Governor-General – Prince Henry, Duke of Gloucester (until 11 March), then William McKell
Prime Minister – Ben Chifley
Chief Justice – Sir John Latham

State Premiers
Premier of New South Wales – William McKell (until 6 February), then James McGirr
Premier of Queensland – Ned Hanlon
Premier of South Australia – Thomas Playford IV
Premier of Tasmania – Robert Cosgrove (until 18 December), then Edward Brooker
Premier of Victoria – John Cain (until 20 November), then Thomas Hollway
Premier of Western Australia – Frank Wise (until 1 April), then Ross McLarty

State Governors
Governor of New South Wales – Sir John Northcott
Governor of Queensland – Sir John Lavarack
Governor of South Australia – Sir Charles Norrie
Governor of Tasmania – Sir Hugh Binney
Governor of Victoria – Sir Winston Dugan
Governor of Western Australia – none appointed

Events
1 January – A massive hailstorm strikes Sydney, causing hundreds of injuries and an estimated £1 million damage.
6 February – William McKell stands down as Premier of New South Wales following royal approval of his appointment as Governor-General. The Labor Party elects James McGirr as its leader and the new Premier.
15 March – A state election is held in Western Australia. The Labor government of Frank Wise is defeated by the Liberal/Country coalition led by Ross McLarty.
3 May – A state election is held in Queensland. Ned Hanlon's Labor government is returned for its sixth term in government.
1 April – The Woomera rocket range is established in South Australia as a testing site for British and Australian missiles.
5 May – A train derails in the Camp Mountain rail accident in Queensland, killing 16 people.
15–17 June – Major flooding in Tasmania.
30 June – The Australian government assumes control of Qantas.
1 July – Real estate company L. J. Hooker is listed on the Australian Stock Exchange.
5 August – Australia becomes a member of the International Monetary Fund.
30 August – The Commonwealth Court of Conciliation and Arbitration grants workers a 40-hour week.
8 November – A state election is held in Victoria, after the upper house blocks supply. The Labor minority government of John Cain is defeated by a Liberal–Country coalition led by Thomas Hollway.
18 November – Australia reduces its trade tariffs after ratifying the General Agreement on Tariffs and Trade (GATT) in Geneva.
18 December – Robert Cosgrove resigns as Premier of Tasmania after being indicted on charges of bribery and corruption. Edward Brooker is sworn in as his replacement the next day.
26 December – Heard Island and McDonald Islands in Antarctica are transferred from British control to Australian territories.

Arts and literature

 17 January – William Dargie wins the Archibald Prize with his portrait of Marcus Clarke.

Sport
 30 August – Fred Fanning, in his last league match, kicks a VFL/AFL record of eighteen goals against St. Kilda
 20 September – Balmain win the 1947 NSWRFL season, claiming their tenth title after defeating minor premiers Canterbury-Bankstown 13–9. The newly formed Parramatta team finish in last place, claiming the wooden spoon.
 27 September – Carlton 13.8 (86) defeats Essendon 11.19 85 to win the 51st VFL Premiership in the 1947 VFL Grand Final.
 4 November – Hiraji wins the Melbourne Cup.
 30 December – Morna takes line honours and Westward wins on handicap in the Sydney to Hobart Yacht Race.
 The Parramatta rugby league club is formed in Sydney's West. The Manly-Warringah club is also formed in the Northern Beaches.

Births
 10 January
 David Irvine, diplomat, Director-General of ASIS and ASIO (died 2022)
 Stevie Wright, English-Australian singer-songwriter (died 2015)
 29 January – Lorraine Landon, basketball administrator, former player and coach
 8 February – Kerrie Biddell, singer and pianist (died 2014)
 15 May – Graeham Goble, musician  
 19 May – David Helfgott, concert pianist
 29 May – Stan Zemanek, Australian radio broadcaster (died 2007)  
 3 June – Mike Burgmann, racing driver and accountant (died 1986)
 19 June – James Mason, field hockey player
 25 June – Robert Percy, Australian rules footballer 
 14 July – John Blackman, radio and television presenter
 16 July – Don Burke, Television presenter, television producer, author, and horticulturist 
 28 July – Peter Cosgrove, Chief of the Defence Force (2002–05)
 5 August – Angry Anderson, singer & actor 
 28 August – Jennie George, politician and trade unionist
 5 September – Bruce Yardley, Test cricketer (died 2019)
 28 September – Bob Carr, Premier of New South Wales (1995–2005); Senator and Minister for Foreign Affairs (2012–13)
 2 November – David Ahern, composer (died 1988)
 4 November – Rod Marsh, cricketer (died 2022)

Deaths

 16 January – Traugott Bernhard Zwar, academic, army medical officer and surgeon (b. 1876)
 27 February – Charles Hoadley, geologist (b. 1887)
 26 April – Hector Lamond, New South Wales politician (b. 1865)
 27 April
 Robert Barr, Victorian politician (born in the United Kingdom) (b. 1862)
 Roland Green, New South Wales politician (b. 1885)
 9 May – Hugh de Largie, Western Australian politician (born in the United Kingdom) (b. 1859)
 16 May – William McCormack, 22nd Premier of Queensland (b. 1879)
 25 May – Rupert Bunny, painter (b. 1864)
 28 May – Walter Duncan, New South Wales politician (b. 1883)
 1 July – E. Harold Davies, musician, conductor and teacher (born in the United Kingdom) (b. 1867)
 30 July – Sir Joseph Cook, 6th Prime Minister of Australia (b. 1860)
 28 August – Matthew Reid, Queensland politician (born in the United Kingdom) (b. 1856)
 14 September – John Feetham, Anglican bishop (born in the United Kingdom) (b. 1873)
 26 October – Jack Bailey, New South Wales politician (b. 1871)
 19 December – Arthur Wilson, Australian rules footballer, gynaecologist and obstetrician (b. 1888)

See also
 List of Australian films of the 1940s

References

 
Australia
Years of the 20th century in Australia